SG&A (alternately SGA, SAG, G&A or SGNA) is an initialism used in accounting to refer to Selling, General and Administrative Expenses, which is a major non-production cost presented in an income statement (statement of profit or loss).

SGA expenses consist of the combined costs of operating the company, which breaks down to:

 Selling: The sum of all direct and indirect selling expenses, which includes salaries of labour (excluding those related to the production itself which are cost of goods sold), advertising expenses, rent, and all expenses and taxes related to selling product;
 General: General operating expenses and taxes that are directly related to the general operation of the company, but do not relate to the other two categories;
 Administration: Executive salaries and general support and all associated taxes related to the overall administration of the company.
These expenses are sometimes referred to as company overheads, as they can not be traced directly to the production of goods.

See also
 Income statement
 Net income

References

External links
Selling, General & Administrative Expense (SG&A) Definition
SG&A Expense (Selling, General & Administrative) - Guide, Examples
SG&A (Selling, General, & Administrative) Expenses | Business Literacy Institute Financial Intelligence

Expense
Financial statements